Test is a free jazz cooperative.

Members
Tom Bruno: (drums)
Daniel Carter: (saxophones)
Matt Heyner: (double bass)
Sabir Mateen: (saxophones)

Discography
 Ahead! (Eremite, 1998)
 Test (AUM Fidelity, 1999)
 Live (Eremite, 2000)
 Always Coming from the Love Side (Eremite, 2016)
 Test and Roy Campbell (577 Records , 2020)

References

American jazz ensembles